Hussein Al-Bishi  is a Saudi football defender who played for Saudi Arabia in the 1984 Asian Cup.

External links
Stats

References

1961 births
Living people
Saudi Arabian footballers
Olympic footballers of Saudi Arabia
Footballers at the 1984 Summer Olympics
1984 AFC Asian Cup players
Saudi Professional League players
Bisha FC players
Al Hilal SFC players
AFC Asian Cup-winning players
Asian Games medalists in football
Footballers at the 1982 Asian Games
Footballers at the 1986 Asian Games
Asian Games silver medalists for Saudi Arabia
Asian Games bronze medalists for Saudi Arabia
Association football defenders
Medalists at the 1982 Asian Games
Medalists at the 1986 Asian Games
Saudi Arabia international footballers